Ratsafari is the second full-length album by Swedish heavy metal band Mustasch. It was released in 2003.

Track listing
"Stinger Citizen" - 3:12
"Black City" - 2:35
"Unsafe At Any Speed" - 4:34
"Ratsafari" - 4:21
"6:36" - 4:45
"Deadringer" - 3:20
"Fredrika" - 4:59
"Alpha Male" - 3:39
"Mareld" - 1:29
"Lone Song (Reclusion)" - 4:26
"Monday Warrior" - 4:53

References

2003 albums
Mustasch albums